The 34th International Film Festival of India was held from 9–19 October 2003 in New Delhi. The competitive edition was restricted to "Asian Directors and Neelam Kapur was the festival director. Veteran actor Kamal Haasan was the chief guest.

Winners
Life Time Achievement Award - "Liv Ullman"
Golden Peacock (Best Film): "At Five in the Afternoon" by "Samira Makhmalbaf" (Iranian film)
Silver Peacock Award for the Most Promising Asian Director: "Ra'anan Alexandrowicz" for "James' Journey to Jerusalem" (Israeli film)
Silver Peacock Special Jury Award:  "Prohor" by "Subhadro Chowdhury" (Bengali film)

References

2003 film festivals
34th
2003 in Indian cinema